I Need to Know was a Nigerian family-oriented television series aired on the NTA network. It starred Funke Akindele as Bisi, Uche Ejiogu as Ngozi, Taiwo Lesh as Hauwa and Amaka Egwuatu as Essien and was sponsored by the United Nations Population Fund.

As part of its support to the Federal Government’s effort to provide information, education and communication on adolescent health issues in the fourth Country Programme of Assistance (1997–2002), the United Nations Population  Fund (UNFPA) country office in Nigeria supported the production of a television series on adolescent reproductive health, titled I Need to Know.

Concept overview
The title of the series is taken from a sound track that was produced in Kenya by the music group Kalamashaka and other local Artistes with the support of the Kenyan Field Office of UNPFA.  Originally conceived as part of the Composite Adolescent Reproductive Health in Nigeria (CARHIN) project, the television series revolves around the lives, adventures and misadventures of seven secondary school students who encounter the normal challenges of teenagers growing up in a fast changing world, the realities of HIV/AIDS, the tragedy of interrupted education.  I Need to Know depicts young people actively grappling with these matters, sometimes getting the right information in time and sometimes suffering the consequences of ignorance or misinformation. 
The series was conceptualized with the objective of encouraging parent-child communication and open dialogue on adolescent sexual health issues.  It aims through the many topics the series dealt with, to arm young people with the information they need to make informed and responsible choices.  This in turn with help reduce their susceptibility to irresponsible and uninformed behavior that often results in teenage pregnancies, illegal and unsafe abortions, and contraction of sexually transmitted diseases including HIV/AIDS.

It has been demonstrated by research that these incidents generally result from a lack of knowledge on reproductive health issues. Primarily targeting young adults (aged 10–24 years), the television series the promoters of the series also hoped that families would use I Need to Know as an ice-breaker to encourage young people to seek counseling from parents and guardians, and also encourage the parents and guardians to equip themselves with appropriate listening and counseling skills. It also targeted policy makers who have the ability to provide a favorable environment for adolescents to have access to reproductive health information and services that give them the power of knowledge. I Need to Know attempted to de-mystify the discussion of sexuality issues between Parents and Children, thus encouraging Parent-child communication during this important process of growing up.  The Programme also illustrated vividly the consequences of poor or ignorant choices made by young persons and the disadvantage of yielding to peer pressure.
A total of 91 episodes (7 quarters) of Television and 104 episodes (8 quarters) of the radio series were produced. The series was aired by television stations from 1998–2002. It continues to re-run on a few stations.

Production team
The Series was conceptualized by a creative team led by UNFPA’s IEC department, written by Biola During-Olatunde, Produced/Directed by Lloyd Weaver. The UNFPA Country team responsible for the production comprised Country Representative – J. Bill Musoke, Deputy Representative - Danielle Landry, Reproductive Health Officer – Dr. Julitta Duncan-and Senior IEC/Advocacy Programme Associate - Ronke Oshin.

Broadcast
The 30-minute weekly TV series was aired on private and state television stations in Nigeria under an innovative joint broadcast agreement deal that was unprecedented at that time in the development sector. The deal secured prime-time slots of the I Need to Know at no airtime cost to UNFPA. The terms of the Joint Broadcast Agreement stated as follows:  
a)	UNFPA is obliged to air a minimum of 2 (two) spots of UNFPA public service announcements (PSAs) within each programme 
b)	The remaining advertising time may be commercially exploited by the Programme User subject to conditions stated in 4c – 4e below. 
c)	The following category of commercials may not be aired within or adjacent to the UNFPA programmes: Commercials containing political statements or campaigns, alcohol, drugs, tobacco or Baby formulae or breast-milk substitute products. 	
d)	The Programme User will abide by the laws, rules, customs, attitudes and advertising regulations in the host community of broadcast. 
e)	 Except where so stated, the programmes are to carry a maximum of 3 (three) or 6 (six) minutes of advertising commercials on thirty- and sixty-minute programmes respectively.

Radio adaptation
In 2002, a radio adaption of the series was produced with support from the Canadian International Development Agency (CIDA). It was broadcast on 22 Radio stations under a radio joint broadcast agreement that was patterned after the television broadcast arrangement.

Television and cable stations in the joint broadcast arrangement
Adamawa Television 
African Independent Television Lagos 
Bauchi State Television 
Borno State Television 
Broadcasting Corporation of Abia State
Delta State Broadcasting Service  
Edo State Broadcasting Services 
Imo Broadcasting Corporation (IBC TV) 
Independent Television, Benin City 
Nigerian Television Authority Channel 7, Ikeja 
Ogun State Television 
Ondo State Television Corporation 
Osun State Television
Plateau Radio Television Corporation 
Rivers State Television 
Taraba State Television 
Minaj Television, Obosi 
DSTV/Multichoice 
Nigeria Nigerian Television Authority (NTA) network

Radio stations in the joint broadcast arrangement
Cool FM, Lagos
Rhythm FM, Lagos
BCOS FM, Ibadan
OGBC FM, Abeokuta
OSRC FM, Akure
Edo FM, Benin
Minaj FM, Obosi  
Radio Rivers FM, PH
AKBC FM, Uyo
Enugu Radio FM
BCA FM, Umuahia
IBC FM, Owerri
PRVC, Jos
Afro Radio FM, Abuja
Ray Power 2 Abuja	
Kaduna Radio FM
Katsina FM
ABC FM, Yola
Radio Benue FM
Bauchi Radio FM
Borno Radio FM
Rima Radio FM, Kano

Kalamashaka at launch
Seizing an opportunity offered by the group’s invitation  to participate in the Benson and Hedges ‘Golden Tones’ concert in December 1998, UNFPA Nigeria organized the launch event on 16 December at the University of Lagos to feature an appearance by Kalamashaka, the Kenyan group that produced the song whose sound title-track gave the series its name. The synergy presented by a group of young Kenyan Musicians delivering the message of Adolescent Health issues went a long way to communicate to young Nigerians that adolescent reproductive health issues are real, peculiar but global.

The launch event  included the filming of a Cameo appearance of the Musical group Kalamashaka (visiting from Kenya) in the TV series, a sneak preview of the TV series to the media and guests, as well as a mini-concert by the Musical group. The event took place at the Institute of Distance Learning, University of Lagos.  The group performed the title sound track: ‘I need to know’, in front of 2000 students from 25 secondary schools in Lagos.  There was interaction between the group and the audience, to discuss ARH issues.  T-shirts branded with the TV series title were distributed along with other give away items. UNFPA provided accommodation, transportation and security for the group from Monday 13 December, after they had concluded their Golden Tones concert and also arranged for their departure from Lagos to Kenya on Thursday 17 December. They were also paid an honorarium for their cameo appearance in the TV series.

Impact assessment
In the third quarter of 1999 after I Need to Know had been airing for about one year, Research and Marketing Services (RMS) conducted an impact assessment/survey of the Programme.  Some of the conclusions of the survey were that the Programme should be continued in order to consolidate on its gains and the series should be further expanded in reach in order to optimize its potential to save the lives of young persons. Another independent assessment conducted by the Canadian International Development Agency convinced the agency to fund the second year of the series as well as its expansion to Radio. The series was also broadcast by the Ghanaian Broadcast Service with permission from UNFPA Nigeria.

References

1990s Nigerian television series